The Clarke/Duke Project II is the second collaborative album by American musicians Stanley Clarke and George Duke. It was released in 1983 through Epic Records. The album peaked at number 146 on the Billboard 200 and at number 44 on the Top R&B/Hip-Hop Albums chart.

Track listing

Personnel 

 Stanley Clarke – bass, cello, guitar, piccolo, vocals
 Clydene Jackson – vocals
 Lynn Davis – vocals
 Portia Griffin – vocals
 Howard Hewett – vocals
 Jeffrey Osborne – vocals 
 Sylvia St. James – vocals
 Deborah Thomas – vocals
 Debra Starr – vocals
 Julia Tillman – vocals
 Maxine Willard Water – vocals
 Cruz Baca Sembello – background vocals
 Billy Cobham – drums
 John "J.R." Robinson – drums
 Narada Michael Walden – drums
 Alphonso Johnson – bass
 Paulinho Da Costa – percussion
 Michael Sembello – guitar
 George Del Barrio – string arrangements
 Allan Harshman – strings
 Barbara Hunter – strings
 Bonnie Douglas – strings
 Brenton Banks – strings
 Dave Schwartz – strings
 Dixie Blackstone – strings
 Edward Green – strings
 Gareth "Garry" Nuttycombe – strings
 Harry Bluestone – strings
 Jan Kelley – strings
 Katie Kirkpatrick – strings
 Murray Adler – strings
 Nathan Ross – strings
 Pat Johnson – strings
 Paul Shure – strings
 Ray Kelley – strings
 Reg Hill – strings
 Robert Sushel – strings
 Ronald Cooper – strings
 Rollice Dale – strings
 William Criss – oboe
Technical
 Michael Herbick – engineer
 Mitch Gibson – engineer
 Nick Spigel – engineer
 Tom Perry – engineer
 Eric Zobler – engineer
 Tommy Vicari – engineer, mixer
 Brian Gardner – mastering
 Vic Anesini – mastering

Chart history

References

External links 

1983 albums
George Duke albums
Stanley Clarke albums
Epic Records albums
Collaborative albums
Sequel albums
Albums produced by George Duke
Albums produced by Stanley Clarke